The Supercuts Superbike Challenge is a race held at Sonoma Raceway every May. It is a popular race among Californians.

Motorcycle races in the United States
Sports in Sonoma County, California